The Drink is an English odd dark folk pop band based in London, England. Made up of Dearbhla Minogue, David Stewart and Daniel Fordham, they formed in late 2012 when Dearbhla recruited Daniel and David after their former band Fighting Kites split as she had got to know them whilst living above their rehearsal space. Their first record, Company, was released in 2014. The group's second album Capital was released in November 2015.

Discography

Albums
Company, released 1 December 2014
Capital, released 13 November 2015

References

Drink, The